Hall, also stylized as HALL, is a 2020 Canadian mystery horror film that was directed by Francesco Giannini.

Synopsis
Two women, each dealing with unhappy marriages, find themselves trapped in a hotel hallway as a deadly airborne virus ravages the hotel clientele and the outside world.

Cast
 Julian Richings as Julian
 Carolina Bartczak as Val
 Yumiko Shaku as Naomi
Vlasta Vrana as Peter
 Christopher James Giannini as Piano man
 Dawn Ford as Christine
 Mark Gibson as Branden
 Kathleen Fee as Betty
 Bailey Thain as Kelly
 Val Mervis as Dianne
 Genti Bejko as Jonah
 Kim Richardson as Dolores

Production
Director Francesco Giannini became interested in Hall after being approached by screenwriter Adam Kolodny. Giannini had previously worked with co-writer Derrick Adams and was intrigued by the question "what would happen if vaccines were created intentionally for purposes of government control and for the profit of the pharmaceutical industry, not necessarily to cure viruses?" The film marked the feature film directorial debut of Giannini, who had previously directed short movies and worked as an actor and extra.

Actress Yumiko Shaku was brought on to portray Naomi, one of the film's protagonists.  Giannini has noted that Shaku was "an integral part in getting HALL made" and that "Without Yumiko’s involvement, the film would not have the same impact." Filming took place in a working hotel over twelve days and used primarily practical effects, as Giannini wanted it to be "an ode to the older horror films from the ’70s and ’80s that helped inspire my love of cinema".

Release
Hall premiered on August 30, 2020 at FrightFest.

Reception
Common elements of praise centered around Giannini's choice of filming location, acting, and the movie's premise. Ginger Nuts of Horror also praised the themes of domestic abuse, writing that they "play very well with a realistic subtly more akin to these actual relationships." Criticism focused upon the script, which Flickering Myth felt was "shockingly padded" and Ginger Nuts of Horror wrote "needed another solid rewrite to tackle obvious storytelling issues."

References

External links
 

2020 horror films
English-language Canadian films
2020s English-language films
Films about viral outbreaks
Films set in hotels
Canadian horror films
2020s mystery films
2020s Canadian films